The Best of Della Reese is a compilation album released by RCA Victor in 1972. The album collects tracks from Reese's RCA years, recorded between 1959 and 1963.

Track listing

Side A
"Don't You Know?" (2:31)
"Won'cha Come Home, Bill Bailey?" (3:05)
"Everyday" (2:17)
"Someday (You'll Want Me to Want You)" (4:07)
"Blue Skies" (1:45)
"Please Don't Talk About Me When I'm Gone" (2:08)

Side B
"Not One Minute More" (2:35)
"Thou Swell" (2:22)
"If You Are But a Dream" (3:01)
"There's Nothing Like a Boy" (2:00)
"Diamonds Are a Girl's Best Friend" (2:48)
"While We're Young" (3:14)

References

 http://rateyourmusic.com/release/comp/della_reese/the_best_of_della_reese/

1972 greatest hits albums
Della Reese albums
RCA Victor compilation albums